Paul J. Girouard, M.S. (December 27, 1898 – February 20, 1964) was an American-born missionary and bishop of the Catholic Church in Madagascar. He served as the Bishop of Morondava from 1955 to 1964.

Biography
Born in Hamilton, Rhode Island, Paul Girouard was ordained a priest on July 26, 1927, for the Missionaries of Our Lady of La Salette.  On December 30, 1954 Pope Pius XII appointed him to be the Apostolic Prefect of Morondava.  He was then appointed as the first bishop of Morondava on November 7, 1955.  He was consecrated a bishop by Archbishop Henry O'Brien of Hartford on March 7, 1956. The principal co-consecrators were Bishops William Scully of Albany and Russell McVinney of Providence.  Girouard served as the diocesan bishop until his death on February 20, 1964, at the age of 65.

References

1898 births
1964 deaths
People from Washington County, Rhode Island
Missionaries of La Salette Order
20th-century Roman Catholic bishops in Madagascar
American Roman Catholic missionaries
American expatriates in Madagascar
Catholics from Rhode Island
Roman Catholic bishops of Morondava